St Just in Roseland is a village and civil parish in Cornwall, England, United Kingdom. The 2011 Census recorded the parish population as 1,158.

St Just in Roseland lies within the Cornwall Area of Outstanding Natural Beauty (AONB).

Churches
St Just in Roseland is noted for its 13th-century Church of England parish church, St Just’s Church, St Just in Roseland, set in riverside gardens planted with semitropical shrubs and trees, many of which are species rare in England. The church is on the edge of a tidal creek beside the Carrick Roads on the Fal Estuary just outside the main village. The path from the road to the church is lined with granite blocks carved with quotations and verses taken from the Bible.

Notable people
The ornithologist Edward Hearle Rodd was born here. The lichenologist Peter Wilfred James (1930 - 2014) was born here although brought up in Sutton Coldfield. The cricketer Michael Harris (known as "Pasty" Harris) also came from the parish.

References

External links

 

Civil parishes in Cornwall
Gardens in Cornwall
Villages in Cornwall